Pomacentrus bankanensis, commonly known as the speckled damsel, is a species of damselfish found in the western Pacific. It occasionally makes its way into the aquarium trade. It grows to a size of 9 cm in length.

References

External links
 
 Speckled Damsel @ Fishes of Australia

bankanensis
Marine fish of Northern Australia
Fish described in 1853